Hoogya  is a village in the southern state of Karnataka, India. It is located in the Kollegal taluk of Chamarajanagar district.

Demographics
 India census, Hoogya had a population of 8131 with 4280 males and 3851 females.

See also
 Chamarajanagar
 Districts of Karnataka

References

External links
 

Villages in Chamarajanagar district